Matthew Lokan (born 20 November 1982) is a former professional Australian rules footballer who played for the Collingwood Football Club in the Australian Football League (AFL), as well as the Port Adelaide Magpies in the South Australian National Football League (SANFL).

Lokan played in the forward pocket for the Port Adelaide Magpies in the SANFL and was drafted by Collingwood at the age of 20 in the 2002 AFL Draft with pick 70.

Collingwood moved Lokan to a half-back flank and he made his senior AFL debut in round 1, 2003, playing all matches that season, including the Grand Final against Brisbane. In 2004 he played every game up until round 13 before being omitted. He came back for five more games that year before once again being omitted.  In 2005 he played only three games before being delisted at the end of the year. In total, Lokan played 46 matches in three seasons, averaging 7.8 disposals per game. In 2006 Lokan returned to play for the Port Adelaide Magpies, his original club.

In 2012, he became the playing coach of the Belconnen Magpies in the North East Australian Football League (NEAFL). On 22 January 2015, Lokan was announced as the new coach of SANFL side Glenelg.

On 13 November 2017, it was announced that Lokan would return to Port Adelaide as the head coach of the Magpies' SANFL senior squad.

References

External links 

Matthew Lokan at the Collingwood Football Club website 
Matthew Lokan at the Port Adelaide Magpies website 

1982 births
Living people
Collingwood Football Club players
Port Adelaide Magpies players
Australian rules footballers from South Australia
Belconnen Football Club players
Glenelg Football Club coaches